Alive in Athens is a live album by American heavy metal band Iced Earth. It was recorded on the nights of January 23 and January 24, 1999, in front of sold-out crowds of approximately 2000 people (on both nights) at the Rodon Club in Athens, Greece. Iced Earth was supporting the Something Wicked This Way Comes album and were on tour.  It was turned into a single DVD, and released in October 2006. The album features the return of former drummer Brent Smedley, who did not record on the band's previous album.

At the conclusion of "Violate", the band plays the opening riff of "The Trooper" by Iron Maiden. "Colors" was also played at this concert, but was not included on the CD due to a track listing mix-up. It is, however, included on the reissue of The Melancholy E.P..

Next to the CD version, there also exists a vinyl box version. It was released in 1999 and contained five pictures of the band's albums. One had the Alive in Athens artwork, the other ones had the Night of The Stormrider, Dark Saga, Days of Purgatory and Something Wicked This Way Comes artwork. It came originally with an Alive in Athens poster signed by Jon Schaffer. This box had the same track list as the three-disc version.

In 2008, Century Media reissued the three-CD release in a limited mini-LP gatefold sleeve. It included "Colors" as a bonus track on disc two.

According to a 2003 post by Jon Schaffer, the album was certified Platinum in Greece.

Track listing

Disc I

Disc II 

Bonus track (2008 reissue)

Disc III

DVD
On October 30, 2006, Century Media released a DVD version featuring live footage of the concert.

Shortly before the DVD was publicly released, Iced Earth rhythm guitarist and founder Jon Schaffer offered a statement which voiced dissatisfaction with Century Media (with whom Iced Earth was no longer signed at the time).  A portion of this statement reads:

"I want you all to be aware of what it is that they [Century Media] are releasing. This is a very low-budget, badly edited video of an amazing concert and an awesome period in the history of Iced Earth. They promised me that they are going to keep the price down and that they are not going to market it as something it's not. But I feel it's my responsibility to let you know the reality of the situation."

Schaffer did not, however, go so far as to call for a boycott of the product, saying, "The decision to purchase the 'Alive in Athens' DVD is up to you. I just want you to be aware of what it is you're getting should you choose to do so."

The song order is not identical to that featured on the album version.  A few songs are also missing, including "Slave to the Dark", "A Question of Heaven", and "Iced Earth". "Colors" was played at this concert as well, but was not included on the CD or DVD due to a track listing mix up. It is however included on The Melancholy E.P. and the 2008 re-release of Alive in Athens.

Bonus features
Iced Earth Backstage
Jon Schaffer in Athens

Personnel

Iced Earth
Jon Schaffer – rhythm guitar, vocals
Matthew Barlow – lead vocals
James MacDonough – bass guitar
Larry Tarnowski – lead guitar
Guest musicians
Rick Risberg – keyboards
Brent Smedley – drums

Production
Jim Morris – production, mixing
Axel Hermann – artwork
Danny Miki – artwork
Travis Smith – artwork
Chris Kissadjekian – photography
Matthias Grünewald –  editor

References

External links
Alive in Athens CD at The Official Iced Earth Website
Alive in Athens DVD at The Official Iced Earth Website
Alive in Athens CD at Century Media
Alive in Athens DVD at Century Media

1999 live albums
2006 live albums
2006 video albums
Century Media Records albums
Iced Earth albums
Iced Earth video albums
Live video albums
Albums with cover art by Travis Smith (artist)